was a Japanese aikido master and a pre-war and post-war disciple of aikido founder Morihei Ueshiba.

Tanaka was a judo practitioner when he met Ueshiba in 1936. Eager to learn about aikido, he set up a dojo in Osaka for Noriaki (Yoichiro) Inoue, early student and nephew of Ueshiba. He followed Inoue and Ueshiba's teachings until 1939 when he was drafted to go to war. His proficiency in aikido secured him a position as a bodyguard in the army. He returned to Osaka after the war and resumed the practice of aikido. He also went to Iwama (during the construction of his dojo in Osaka) and trained alongside other renowned students of Ueshiba. He was one of the few students who trained with Ueshiba before and after the war.

Ueshiba contacted Tanaka in 1951 and suggested him to build his own dojo in Osaka, the future Osaka Aikikai Dojo. After the dojo's inauguration (early 1952), Ueshiba spent several months there teaching aikido  and he frequently returned to visit and teach.

Tanaka remained the chief instructor of the Osaka Aikikai Dojo until his death. He was 9th dan Aikikai. Yukio Kawahara, technical director of the Canadian Aikido Federation, Higuchi Takanari, chief instructor of the Kyoto Renmei Dojo, Seiji Tomita, founder of the Ban Sen Juku school in Belgium and Ishu Ishiyama, chief instructor of the Vancouver West Aikikai Dojo figure among his students.

Ban Sen Juku school  
The Ban Sen Juku school is an international school for aikido named after Bansen Tanaka. The school has its headquarters in Belgium and dojos in France, Reunion Island, Spain, Tahiti and the United Kingdom. The school teaches aikido and focuses on seeking the essence of traditional Japanese martial arts through several kinds of training. There is weaponless aikido practice with special attention for aiki, taijutsu and atemi. Moreover, there is weapon training with focus on tanto, iai, bokken and jo. Teaching is in the traditional style in which efficiency and effectiveness are key. The pursuit of aikido on the Ban Sen Juku mats is mainly towards the essence of aikido. Although this pursuit seems physical at first, it requires self development of the mind as well.

Tomita Seiji Shihan, the founder and president of the Ban Sen Juku school, has transferred his knowledge of many domains other than aikido such as zazen, misogi (purification), ki training, ki shiatsu massage, Japanese calligraphy and Japanese cooking. All the activities contain the same spirit: whatever we do, if we add aikido principles, we will do it more efficiently.

References

1912 births
1988 deaths
Japanese aikidoka

Martial artists by nationality
Martial artists